Pereida v. Wilkinson, 592 U.S. ___ (2021),  was a United States Supreme Court (the Court) case in which the Court ruled that under the Immigration and Nationality Act (INA) an alien seeking to cancel a lawful removal order bears the burden of showing that he has not been convicted of a disqualifying offense.  An alien has not carried that burden when the record shows he has been convicted under a statute limiting multiple offenses, some of which are disqualifying, and the record is ambiguous as to which crime formed the basis of his conviction.

Background
Under the INA, certain nonpermanent residents may seek to cancel an order of removal and adjust to the status of an alien lawfully admitted for permanent residence by applying to the United States Attorney General through the Executive Office for Immigration Review (EOIR), a subagency of the United States Department of Justice. As part of their application, the alien must demonstrate that they (1) have been physically present in the United States for a continuous period of not less than 10 years immediately preceding the application, (2) have been a person of good moral character during such period, (3) have not been convicted of an offense that would either render them inadmissible to be admitted to the United States or deportable from the United States, and (4) establishes that removal would result in exceptional and extremely unusual hardship to the alien's qualifying relative who is a United States citizen or lawful permanent resident.

Clemente Avelino Pereida was a citizen of Mexico who entered the United States without authorization or inspection in approximately 1995. He relocated to Nebraska with his family, was gainfully employed and paid taxes, and with his wife raised three children, one a U.S. citizen and another a Deferred Action for Childhood Arrivals recipient. After an arrest, he was identified as an unlawfully present alien, and placed into removal proceedings in 2009. He did not contest his removability but instead applied to cancel his removal and adjust status to a lawful permanent resident. To demonstrate the requirements for cancellation of removal meant he had to produce records of his criminal history. But given his recent arrest, he was progressing through immigration proceedings in tandem with his criminal case.

In his criminal case, state authorities charged him with attempted criminal impersonation for using a false Social Security card to seek employment at National Service Company of Iowa. The Nebraska Statute section 28-608 (2008) charged four different means in which a person could violate attempted criminal impersonation. Pereida was found guilty under the statute, he paid a fine and served no jail time for the offense.

While Pereida identified his conviction for his cancellation of removal application, he declined to offer any evidence of his conviction. The United States Department of Homeland Security produced his criminal complaint but that document did not specify which of the four means he actually violated. That was problematic because three of the means were disqualifying offenses as a crime involving moral turpitude (CIMT) that rendered him inadmissible or deportable while one (carrying a business without a license) did not. Pereida argued that such ambiguity meant that his prior conviction could not be construed as a disqualifying offense to bar eligibility for relief. The EOIR Immigration Judge presiding over his case determined that Pereida's attempted criminal impersonation conviction was a CIMT that disqualified him from cancellation of removal and ordered him removed from the United States.

Pereida appealed to the Board of Immigration Appeals (BIA).  Although the BIA found no record as to which particular means he was convicted of violating, they noted that Pereida bore the burden of proving that his conviction was not a CIMT, and dismissed his appeal.

Pereida petitioned the Eighth Circuit claiming that his conviction does not fall within the definition of CIMT and that even if his conviction qualifies as a CIMT, it falls within the petty offense exception.  The Eighth Circuit denied his petition holding that under the modified categorical approach they were unable to discern which means he was convicted. But because it was his burden to demonstrate eligibility for relief, he had the obligation to establish that his conviction was not a CIMT, and his failure to produce sufficient conviction records meant he did not carry his burden and thus was ineligible for cancellation of removal.  The Eighth Circuit noted that the absence of the necessary substantive determination of the existence of a CIMT precluded any inquiry of the petty offense exception.  Pereida petitioned for rehearing on en banc which the Eighth Circuit denied.

United States Supreme Court
Pereida petitioned for Writ of Certiorari with the United States Supreme Court that was granted on December 18, 2019. The Court heard oral arguments from the parties on October 14, 2020. Prior to the oral arguments, Justice Ruth Bader Ginsburg had died, while her replacement, Justice Amy Coney Barrett, had not yet been confirmed. As such, Justice Barrett did not participate in the case. Before the Court, Pereida reiterated his argument that any ambiguity about his prior conviction meant that the crime could not be a disqualifying offense under the categorical approach and therefore would not bar eligibility for relief.

On March 4, 2021, the Court issued its opinion in a 5–3 ruling affirming the Eighth Circuit's decision. Justice Neil Gorsuch wrote the majority opinion and was joined by Justices Brett Kavanaugh, Samuel Alito, Clarence Thomas, and Chief Justice John Roberts.

The Court found that the INA expressly requires individuals seeking relief from lawful removal orders to prove all aspects of their eligibility which includes proving they were not convicted of a disqualifying crime. The Court noted that Pereida agreed that he must prove three of the four statutory eligibility requirements for cancellation of removal for certain nonpermanent residents with the exception of proving the disqualifying offense. But the Court explained that there were two inquiries, factual and hypothetical. The factual inquiry was to determine which crime formed the basis of his conviction, and the hypothetical to ask whether someone could commit such crime of conviction without fraud, such as under the categorical approach. The Court found that Pereida's failure to produce any evidence as to the actual crime of conviction meant they could not proceed to tackle the hypothetical question, and thus he failed to carry his burden of proving he had not been convicted of a disqualifying crime, as required by the INA.

Justice Stephen Breyer wrote the dissenting opinion, joined by Justices Elena Kagan and Sonia Sotomayor. Breyer stated that placing the burden on the alien would require them "to introduce a wide range of documentary evidence and testimony to establish", creating a high standard of burden that many aliens may not be able to meet. Breyer continued that the burden should be on the government to prove that the crime was one of moral turpitude rather than the alien, and that in Pereida's case, this had not yet been shown by the government.

References

External links 
 

2021 in United States case law
United States immigration and naturalization case law
United States Supreme Court cases
United States Supreme Court cases of the Roberts Court